Manithan is a 1987 Indian Tamil-language masala film directed by S. P. Muthuraman, starring Rajinikanth, Rupini and Raghuvaran, with Senthil, Delhi Ganesh and Srividya. It was released 21 October 1987, and emerged a silver jubilee hit.

Plot 

The story revolves around Raja, who grows up in juvenile detention due to hitting his teacher by a table weight for falsely calling him a thief due to the only reason he was born on a No Moon Day. He was born to a superstitious father who believes that a person born on a No Moon Day will surely turn criminal. When his imprisonment years are over, he joins the People Welfare Organisation in a local community and helps the needy people. In due course, he gets enemies due to his good deeds. The rest of the story forms on how Raja succeeds over his enemies and disproves the false claims on him and the superstitions and prejudice that surrounded him.

Cast 
 Rajinikanth as Raja
 Rupini as Ruba
 Raghuvaran as Kumaravelu
 Srividya as Lakshmi, Raja's elder sister
 Jai Ganesh as Sridhar
 Madhuri as Indra
 Vinu Chakravarthy as Rathnavelu
 Cho Ramaswamy as Ponnambalam
 Senthil as Arivu
G. Srinivasan as Chinnaya
 Delhi Ganesh as Marimuthu

Production 
V. C. Guhanathan developed a story named Amavasayil Pirandha Oruvanin Kadhai which Panchu Arunachalam expanded into a screenplay. With Rajinikanth cast in the lead role, AVM titled the film Manithan as they felt Rajinikanth was a fantastic man. Distributors objected to the title as there was previously a play of the same name staged by TKS Brothers, but AVM refused to change the title of their film. Rupini accepted to star in Manithan after another film she was doing, Sir I Love You, was shelved.

Soundtrack 
The music was composed by Chandrabose. Lyrics for this film were written by Vairamuthu.

Release and reception 
Manithan was released 21 October 1987, Diwali day. Despite facing competition from Nayakan, released on the same day, it emerged more successful, and a silver jubilee hit. N. Krishnaswamy of The Indian Express wrote, "It is a no-holds-barred commercial film, but the formula works." Jayamanmadhan of Kalki, however, reviewed the film more negatively for being too formulaic.

Legacy 
Manithan was screened alongside other films of Rajinikanth like Murattu Kaalai, Pokkiri Raja, Paayum Puli at Albert theatre, on the occasion of his birthday on 12 December 2012. The film's title inspired that of a 2016 film.

References

Bibliography

External links 
 
 

1980s masala films
1980s Tamil-language films
1987 films
AVM Productions films
Films about superstition
Films directed by S. P. Muthuraman
Films scored by Chandrabose (composer)
Films with screenplays by Panchu Arunachalam